= Klevehill Park =

- Location within Gauteng Location within South Africa
- Coordinates: 26.036°S 28.036°E
- Country: South Africa
- Province: Gauteng
- Municipality: City of Johannesburg
- Main Place: Sandton

Area
  - Total: 0.35 km^{2} (0.14 sq mi)

Population (2011)
  - Total: 544
  - Density: 1,600/km^{2} (4,000/sq mi)

Racial makeup (2011)
  - Black African: 34.9%
  - Coloured: 3.7%
  - Indian/Asian: 5.7%
  - White: 53.2%
  - Other: 2.6%

First languages (2011)
  - English: 61.4%
  - Zulu: 10.0%
  - Afrikaans: 6.8%
  - Tswana: 4.7%
  - Other: 17.0%
- Time zone: UTC+2 (SAST)
- Postal code (street): 2191
- PO box: 2151

Klevehill Park is a suburb of Johannesburg, South Africa. It is located in Region E of the City of Johannesburg Metropolitan Municipality.
